USS Pocahontas (YT/YTB/YTM-266), was a type V2-ME-A1 harbor tug that entered service in the United States Navy in 1943, and was sold in 1976. She was the third ship to bear the name Pocahontas.

History
Pocahontas was laid down, under Maritime Commission contract, as Port Blakeley (MC hull 433) by Birchfield Boiler Incorporated, Tacoma, Washington on 27 October 1941. She was launched 2 May 1942, sponsored by Mrs. Alvin Davies.

Renamed Pocahontas (YT–266) on 4 July 1942, she was delivered to the Maritime Commission and transferred to the Navy on 31 December 1942; and placed in service, in the 11th Naval District, 16 March 1943.

Redesignated YTB–266, 15 May 1944, served the 11th Naval District, headquartered at San Diego, until after World War II. Between 1946 and 1955, she operated in the 12th Naval District, headquartered at San Francisco, then returned to the 11th Naval District. Redesignated YTM–266 in February 1962, she continued to provide tug and towing services to that district.

Pocahontas was sold to Crowley Maritime in 1972 and provided tug services until purchased by her present owners in 1997. She was sold for scrap at Sausalito, 25 February 2019.

Awards
USS Pocahontas earned the American Campaign Medal, the World War II Victory Medal and the National Defense Service Medal for her service in the U.S. Navy.

See also
 Sotoyomo-class fleet tug
 Victory ships
 Liberty ship
 Type C1 ship
 Type C2 ship
 Type C3 ship
 United States Merchant Marine Academy
 List of auxiliaries of the United States Navy

References

Bibliography

 
 
 

World War II merchant ships of the United States
Auxiliary tugboat classes
Harbor vessels of the United States
Tugs of the United States Navy
Ships built in Tacoma, Washington
1942 ships